The Lo Nuestro Award for Pop Female Artist of the Year  is an award presented annually by American television network Univision. It was first awarded in 1989 and has been given annually since. The accolade was established to recognize the most talented performers of Latin music. The nominees and winners were originally selected by a voting poll conducted among program directors of Spanish-language radio stations in the United States and also based on chart performance on Billboard Latin music charts, with the results being tabulated and certified by the accounting firm Deloitte. At the present time, the winners are selected by the audience through an online survey. The trophy awarded is shaped in the form of a treble clef.

The award was first presented to Spanish singer Isabel Pantoja. Colombian singer-songwriter Shakira is the most nominated performer and holds the record for the most awards, winning on nine occasions out of twelve nominations. Mexican singer-songwriter Ana Gabriel won in four consecutive ceremonies. Mexican-American singer Jenni Rivera, Cuban-American artist Gloria Estefan, Italian performer Laura Pausini and Mexican singers Thalía and Paulina Rubio have received two awards each. The current holder of the award is Mexican artist Thalía.

Winners and nominees
Listed below are the winners of the award for each year, as well as the other nominees for the majority of the years awarded.

See also

 List of music awards honoring women
 Grammy Award for Best Latin Pop Album
 Latin Grammy Award for Best Female Pop Vocal Album

References

Pop Female Artist of the Year
Music awards honoring women
Pop music awards
Awards established in 1989